This is a list of essayists—people notable for their essay-writing.

Note: Birthplaces (as listed) do not always indicate nationality.

A

B

C-D

E-G

H-J

K-L

M-N

O-R

S

T-Y

References

 List of essayists